Ryszard Staniek (born March 13, 1971 in Zebrzydowice) is a former Polish football midfielder.

Career

Club
He played for such a clubs like Legia Warsaw, Górnik Zabrze, Odra Wodzisław Śląski and CA Osasuna. Ryszard Staniek was the second player who scored for Polish team in the group stage of UEFA Champions League. (1995/1996 season Legia Warsaw - Rosenborg BK 3:1)

National team
Ryszard Staniek was a member of the Poland national team at the 1992 Summer Olympics. He even scored a goal in the final versus Spain.

Coaching career
Now he is a coach of junior team Beskid Skoczów.

References 
  
 Player profile on Polish Olympic Committee website

1971 births
Living people
People from Cieszyn County
Polish footballers
Poland international footballers
Górnik Zabrze players
Legia Warsaw players
Odra Wodzisław Śląski players
CA Osasuna players
La Liga players
Footballers at the 1992 Summer Olympics
Olympic footballers of Poland
Olympic silver medalists for Poland
People from Cieszyn Silesia
Olympic medalists in football
Sportspeople from Silesian Voivodeship
Medalists at the 1992 Summer Olympics
Association football midfielders